Gagata cenia is a species of sisorid catfish found in the Ganges Delta and the Indus River. It has also been reported as occurring in Thailand and Burma.  This species grows to a length of  SL.

References

External links

Sisoridae
Fish of Asia
Fish of Bangladesh
Fish of Pakistan
Fish described in 1822